The 1981 Durham mayoral election was held on November 3, 1981 to elect the mayor of Durham, North Carolina. It saw the election of Charles Markham, who unseated incumbent mayor Harry E. Rodenhizer Jr.

Results

Primary 
The date of the primary was October 6.

Candidate Jim Farthing had withdrawn on September 21, but remained on the ballot and received votes.

General election

References 

Durham
Mayoral elections in Durham, North Carolina
Durham